Melody Carlson (born March 2, 1956) is an American author. She has written over 250 books for women, teens and children, including the Diary of a Teenage Girl series.

Biography

Carlson was born March 2, 1956, in San Francisco, California. She grew up in Springfield, Oregon, and went to Springfield High School and later Lane Community College. She currently resides in Sisters, Oregon. Some of her novels are being adapted for TV and film, including All Summer Long, which premiered for Hallmark Channel in August 2019. Some of her most popular works are the Diary of a Teenage Girl, the True Colors Series series, The Happy Camper, and Christmas at Winter Hill.

Bibliography

Children's Works
 The Ark that
 Counting Baby's Blessings
 The Easterville Miracle (2004)
 God Made Them All
 God Goes With Me
 God lives in my house
 I Can Count on God 
 The Prayer of Jabez for Little Ones
 Secrets of the Vine for Little Ones
 Bitsy's Harvest Party
 Treasure Beyond Measure
 The Lost Lamb
 My Happy Heart
 When the Creepy Things Come Out
 The Prayer of Jabez for Kids
 How God Decorates Heaven for Christmas
 The Wonder of Christmas Family Advent Journey
 Don't Worry [Just Like Jesus Said Series]
 Love Your Neighbor [Just Like Jesus Said Series]
 Secretly Do Good Deeds [Just Like Jesus Said Series]
 Her First Bible

Faithgirlz: The Girls Of 622 Harbor View Series
 Project: Girl Power
 Project: Mystery Bus
 Project: Rescue Chelsea
 Project: Take Charge
 Project: Raising Faith
 Project: Secret Admirer
 Project: Run Away
 Project: Ski Trip

Diary of a Teenage Girl Series

Caitlin Books
(Most famous I do.)
 Becoming Me
 It's My Life
 Who I Am
 On My Own
 I Do

Chloe Books
 My Name is Chloe
 Sold Out
 Road Trip
 Face the Music

Kim Books
 Just Ask
 Meant to Be
 Falling Up
 That Was Then

Maya Books
 A Not So Simple Life
 It's a Green Thing
 What Matters Most

TrueColors
TrueColors is intended for a teenage audience. Topics in this series include sexuality, drug and alcohol abuse, suicide, eating disorders, and friendships.

 Dark Blue: Color Me Lonely (January 2004)
 Deep Green: Color Me Jealous (March 2004)
 Torch Red: Color Me Torn (July 2004)
 Pitch Black: Color Me Lost (September 2004)
 Burnt Orange: Color Me Wasted (January 2005)
 Fool's Gold: Color Me Consumed (July 2005)
 Blade Silver: Color Me Scarred (October 2005)
 Bitter Rose: Color Me Crushed (January 2006)
 Faded Denim: Color Me Trapped (June 2006)
 Bright Purple: Color Me Confused (September 2006)
 Moon White: Color Me Enchanted (January 2007)
 Harsh Pink: Color Me Burned (June 2007)

Carter House Girls series
 Mixed Bags 2008
 Stealing Bradford 2008
 Homecoming Queen 2008
 Viva Vermont 2008
 Lost in Las Vegas February 2009
 New York Debut 2009
 Spring Breakdown 2010
 Last Dance 2010

On the Runway
 Premiere 2010
 Catwalk  2010
 Rendezvous 2010
 Spotlight 2010
 Glamour 2011
 Ciao 2011

86 Bloomberg Place series
 I Heart Bloomberg
 Let Them Eat Fruitcake 2008
 Spring Broke  2009
 Three Weddings and a Bar Mitzvah 2009

Notes From A Spinning Planet series
 Ireland
 Papua New Guinea
 Mexico

The Secret Life of Samantha McGregor series
 Bad Connection
 Beyond Reach
 Playing With Fire
 Payback

Secrets Series
 Forgotten: Seventeen and Homeless (October 2010)
 Shattered: A Daughter's Regret (April 2011)
 Damaged: A Violated Trust (October 2011)
 Trapped: Caught in a Lie (April 2012)
 Deceived: Lured from the Truth (October 2012)
 Enticed: A Dangerous Connection (April 2013)

Allison Chronicles
 On Hope's Wings
 Cherished Wish
 Autumn Secrets
 Dreams of Promise

By Design Series
 Knowing God Better Than Ever
 Finding Out Who You Really Are
 Making The Most Of Your Relationships
 Discovering A Forgiveness Plan

Degrees Of Betrayal Series
 Sierra's Story
 Ryun's Story
 Kenzie's Story

Degrees Of Guilt Series
 Kyra's Story
 Miranda's Story
 Tyrone's Story

Life at Kingston High Series
 The Jerk Magnet (January 1, 2012)
 The Best Friend (June 1, 2012)
 The Prom Queen (January 1, 2013)

The Dating Games
 First Date (2013)
 Blind Date (2014)
 Double Date (2015)
 Prom Date

Amish Fiction
 A Simple Song
 Double Take
 My Amish Boyfriend
 Trading Secrets

Inn At Shining Waters Series
 River's Song
 River's Call
 Rivers End

Teen Fiction
 Just Another Girl 2009
 Never Been Kissed 2011
 Anything but Normal
 Grace Unplugged
 Princess Wars

Teen Non-fiction
 Piercing Proverbs
 "Becoming Me Journal"

Teen Devotionals
 True: A Teen Devotional
 Life: A Teen Devotional
 Always: A Teen Devotional

Women's Fiction
 Looking for Cassandra Jane 2002
 Armando's Treasure 2003
 Finding Alice 2003
 Crystal Lies
 On This Day 2006
 These Boots Weren't Made For Walking 2007
 A Mile in My Flip-Flops 2008
 The Other Side of Darkness
 "Limelight"

4 Lindas Series
 As Young As We Feel
 Hometown Ties
 All For One
 Here's To Friends

Love Finds You... Series
 Love Finds You in Martha's Vineyard
 Love Finds You in Pendleton, Oregon
 Love Finds You in Sisters, Oregon

A Grace Chapel Inn Series
 Ready to Wed
 Hidden History
 Back Home Again

Homeward on the Oregon Trail Series
 Westward Hearts (August 2012)
 A Dream for Tomorrow (February 2013)
 A Home at Trail's End (July 2013)

Women's Nonfiction
 Dear Mom: Everything Your Teenage Daughter Wants You to Know but Will Never Tell You
 Lost Boys and the Moms Who Love Them
 Take Time

Women's Novellas
 Angels in the Snow 2002
 The Gift of Christmas Present
 The Christmas Bus
 My Son, The Savior: A Mother's Story
 An Irish Christmas
 All I Have to Give 2008
 The Christmas Shoppe

Christmas Novellas
 "Christmas at Harrington's
 The Joy of Christmas: A 3-in-1 Collection
 The Treasure of Christmas: A 3-in-1 Collection

Whispering Pines Series, Harvest House
Someone to Belong To
Looking for You All My Life
A Place to Come Home To
Everything I Long For

References

On Hopes Wings

External links
 Official website

Living people
Christian novelists
American women novelists
21st-century American novelists
Lane Community College alumni
People from Springfield, Oregon
People from Sisters, Oregon
American writers of young adult literature
21st-century American women writers
1956 births